Noritake Takahara (高原 敬武, born June 6, 1951 in Tokyo) is a former racing driver from Japan. He participated in 2 Formula One World Championship Grands Prix, debuting on October 24, 1976. He scored no championship points. Along with his compatriots Masahiro Hasemi and Kazuyoshi Hoshino, he was the first Japanese driver to start a Formula One Grand Prix.

Takahara is a two-time Japanese Formula 2000 champion, winning the title in 1974 and 1976, and resulting vice-champion in 1975 and third in 1973.

He won the Fuji Grand Champion Series three times in 1973, 1975 and 1976, and resulted vice-champion in 1974. He collected 17 wins and 30 podiums in that championship.

Racing record

Japanese Top Formula Championship results
(key)

Complete Formula One World Championship results
(key)

Sources
Profile at www.grandprix.com

1951 births
Living people
Japanese racing drivers
Japanese Formula One drivers
Surtees Formula One drivers
Kojima Formula One drivers
Tasman Series drivers
World Sportscar Championship drivers

Grand Champion Series drivers
Long Distance Series drivers